is a passenger railway station  located in the city of Odawara, Kanagawa Prefecture, Japan, operated by the Izuhakone Railway.

Lines
Iidaoka Station is served by the  Daiyūzan Line, and is located 4.3 kilometers from the line’s terminus at Odawara Station.

Station layout
The station consists of a single side platform with a rain shelter built on the platform as well as a shed housing the machinery for automatic ticket machines. The station is unmanned.

Adjacent stations

History
Iidaoka Station was officially opened on May 19, 1926 in a ceremony attended by the Railway Minister; however, it appears to have been in operation from the opening of the line on October 15, 1925.

Passenger statistics
In fiscal 2019, the station was used by an average of 900 passengers daily (boarding passengers only).

The passenger figures (boarding passengers only) for previous years are as shown below.

Surrounding area
Karikawa River
Tomimizu Elementary School
Izumi Junior High School
Iidaoka Post Office

See also
List of railway stations in Japan

References

External links

Izuhakone Railway home page 

Railway stations in Kanagawa Prefecture
Railway stations in Japan opened in 1926
Izuhakone Daiyuzan Line
Railway stations in Odawara